Quiet Fire is an album by pianist George Cables recorded in 1994 and released on the Danish label, SteepleChase.

Reception 

Ken Dryden of AllMusic stated: "George Cables primarily focuses on jazz compositions in this 1994 trio session ... Highly recommended". The Penguin Guide to Jazz wrote that "Quiet Fire is lovely: a cracking group and a riveting choice of material".

Track listing 
 "Uncle Bubba" (Gary Bartz) – 6:18
 "Quiet Fire" (George Cables) – 5:41
 "My Ship" (Kurt Weill, Ira Gershwin) – 9:54
 "Fried Bananas" (Dexter Gordon) – 7:20
 "Waltz for Monday" (James Leary) – 8:06
 "You Stepped Out of a Dream" (Nacio Herb Brown, Gus Kahn) – 5:56
 "Naima's Love Song" (John Hicks) – 7:07
 "The Decrepit Fox" (Freddie Hubbard) – 6:53

Personnel 
George Cables – piano
Ron McClure – bass
Billy Hart – drums

References 

George Cables albums
1995 albums
SteepleChase Records albums